An altarpiece is an artwork such as a painting, sculpture or relief representing a religious subject made for placing at the back of or behind the altar of a Christian church. Though most commonly used for a single work of art such as a painting or sculpture, or a set of them, the word can also be used of the whole ensemble behind an altar, otherwise known as a reredos, including what is often an elaborate frame for the central image or images. Altarpieces were one of the most important products of Christian art especially from the late Middle Ages to the era of the Counter-Reformation.

Many altarpieces have been removed from their church settings, and often from their elaborate sculpted frameworks, and are displayed as more simply framed paintings in museums and elsewhere.

History

Origins and early development
Altarpieces seem to have begun to be used during the 11th century, with the possible exception of a few earlier examples. The reasons and forces that led to the development of altarpieces are not generally agreed upon. The habit of placing decorated reliquaries of saints on or behind the altar, as well as the tradition of decorating the front of the altar with sculptures or textiles, preceded the first altarpieces.

Many early altarpieces were relatively simple compositions in the form of a rectangular panel decorated with series of saints in rows, with a central, more pronounced figure such as a depiction of Mary or Christ. An elaborate example of such an early altarpiece is the Pala d'Oro in Venice. The appearance and development of these first altarpieces marked an important turning point both in the history of Christian art as well as Christian religious practice. It was considered a "significant development" because of its impact on the "nature and function of the Christian image...the autonomous image now assumed a legitimate position at the centre of Christian worship".

The emergence of panel painting

Painted panel altars emerged in Italy during the 13th century. In the 13th century, it was not uncommon to find frescoed or mural altarpieces in Italy; mural paintings behind the altar served as visual complements for the liturgy. These altarpieces were influenced by Byzantine art, notably icons, which reached Western Europe in greater numbers following the conquest of Constantinople in 1204. During this time, altarpieces occasionally began to be decorated with an outer, sculptured or gabled structure with the purpose of providing a frame for individual parts of the altarpiece. Vigoroso da Siena's altarpiece from 1291 (pictured) display such an altarpiece. This treatment of the altarpiece would eventually pave the way for the emergence, in the 14th century, of the polyptych.

The sculpted elements in the emerging polyptychs often took inspiration from contemporary Gothic architecture. In Italy, they were still typically executed in wood and painted, while in northern Europe altarpieces were often made of stone.

In the early 14th century, the winged altarpiece emerged in Germany, the Low Countries, Scandinavia, the Baltic region and the Catholic parts of Eastern Europe. By hinging the outer panels to the central panel and painting them on both sides, the subject could be regulated by opening or closing the wings. The pictures could thus be changed depending on liturgical demands. The earliest often displayed sculptures on the inner panels (i.e., displayed when open) and paintings on the back of the wings (displayed when closed). With the advent of winged altarpieces, a shift in imagery also occurred. Instead of being centred on a single holy figure, altarpieces began to portray more complex narratives linked to the concept of salvation.

Late Middle Ages and Renaissance

As the Middle Ages progressed, altarpieces began to be commissioned more frequently. In Northern Europe, initially Lübeck and later Antwerp would develop into veritable export centres for the production of altarpieces, exporting to Scandinavia, Spain and northern France. By the 15th century, altarpieces were often commissioned not only by churches but also by individuals, families, guilds and confraternities. The 15th century saw the birth of Early Netherlandish painting in the Low Countries; henceforth panel painting would dominate altarpiece production in the area. In Germany, sculpted wooden altarpieces were instead generally preferred, while in England alabaster was used to a large extent. In England, as well as in France, stone retables enjoyed general popularity. In Italy both stone retables and wooden polyptychs were common, with individual painted panels and often (notably in Venice and Bologna) with complex framing in the form of architectural compositions. The 15th century also saw a development of the composition of Italian altarpieces where the polyptych was gradually abandoned in favour of single-panel, painted altarpieces. In Italy, during the Renaissance, free-standing groups of sculpture also began to feature as altarpieces. In Spain, altarpieces developed in a highly original fashion into often very large, architecturally influenced reredos, sometimes as tall as the church in which it was housed.

In the north of Europe, the Protestant Reformation from the early 16th century onwards led to a swift decline in the number of altarpieces produced. Outbursts of iconoclasm locally led to the destruction of many altarpieces. As an example, during the burning of the Antwerp Cathedral in the course of the Reformation in 1533, more than fifty altarpieces were destroyed. The Reformation in itself also promoted a new way of viewing religious art. Certain motifs, such as the Last Supper, were preferred before others. The Reformation regarded the Word of God – that is, the gospel – as central to Christendom, and Protestant altarpieces often displayed the biblical passages, sometimes at the expense of pictures. With time, Protestant though gave birth to the so-called pulpit altar (Kanzelaltar in German), in which the altarpiece and the pulpit were combined, making the altarpiece a literal abode for the Word of God.

Later developments
The Middle Ages was the heyday of altarpieces, and beginning in the mid-16th century, canvas painting began replacing other altarpieces.

While many altarpieces remain today, the majority have been lost. In 1520, there were 2,000 winged altarpieces in the Austrian state of Tyrol alone; scholars estimate that before World War II, there were around 3,000 altarpieces in the entire territory of Nazi Germany. Many were lost during the Reformation (in the north of Europe) or replaced with Baroque altarpieces during the Counter-Reformation (in the southern part of Europe), or else were discarded during the Enlightenment or replaced with Neo-Gothic altarpieces during the 19th century. In the German-speaking part of Europe, there is only one altarpiece remaining that was made for the high altar of a cathedral (in the Chur Cathedral in Switzerland). In the 18th century, altarpieces like Piero della Francesca's Saint Augustine Altarpiece were often disassembled and seen as independent artworks. The different panels of the polyptych of St Augustine are thus today spread out among several different art museums.

Types of altarpieces

The usage and treatment of altarpieces were never formalised by the Catholic Church, and therefore their appearance can vary significantly. Occasionally, the demarcation between what constitutes the altarpiece and what constitutes other forms of decoration can be unclear. Altarpieces can still broadly be divided into two types, the reredos, which signifies a large and often complex wooden or stone altarpiece, and the retable, an altarpiece with panels either painted or with reliefs. Retables are placed directly on the altar or on a surface behind it; a reredos typically rises from the floor.

Retable-type altarpieces are often made up of two or more separate panels created using a technique known as panel painting. The panels can also display reliefs or sculpture in the round, either polychrome or un-painted. It is then called a diptych, triptych or polyptych for two, three, and multiple panels respectively. In the 13th century, each panel was usually surmounted with a pinnacle, but during the Renaissance, single-panel pala altarpieces became the norm. In both cases, the supporting plinth (predella) often featured supplementary and related paintings.

If the altar stands free in the choir, both sides of the altarpiece can be covered with painting. The screen, retable or reredos are  commonly decorated. Groups of statuary can also be placed on an altar. A single church can furthermore house several altarpieces on side-altars in chapels. Sometimes the altarpiece is set on the altar itself and sometimes in front of it.

Much smaller private altarpieces, often portable, were made for wealthy individuals to use at home, often as folding diptychs or triptychs for safe transport. In the Middle Ages, very small diptychs or triptychs carved in ivory or other materials were popular.

Notable examples

 Pala d'Oro, in Byzantine style (St Mark's Basilica, Venice)
 Maestà altarpiece (1308–1311) by Duccio (Siena Cathedral, Siena)
 Mérode Altarpiece (1425–1428) by Robert Campin (Metropolitan Museum of Art, New York City)
 Ghent Altarpiece (1432) by Hubert and Jan van Eyck (St Bavo's Cathedral, Ghent)
 St. Wolfgang Altarpiece (1481) by Michael Pacher (Church of St. Wolfgang, St. Wolfgang im Salzkammergut)
 Altarpiece of Veit Stoss (1489) by Veit Stoss (St. Mary's Basilica, Kraków)
 Kefermarkt Altarpiece (1490–1497) by an unknown artist (Kefermarkt)
 Isenheim Altarpiece (1516) by Matthias Grünewald (Unterlinden Museum, Colmar)
 Assumption of the Virgin (1516–1518) by Titian (Santa Maria Gloriosa dei Frari, Venice)

See also 
 Reredos
 Retablo
 Iconostasis in front of the Orthodox altar

References

External links

https://web.archive.org/web/20120802145927/http://www.nationalgallery.org.uk/anatomy-of-an-altarpiece

Church architecture